The CF Real Potosino was a Mexican football club based in San Luis Potosí. The club was founded on 2018, and played in Serie B.

History 
The club was founded on July 9, 2018, after it was announced the move of the team Inter San Miguel from San Miguel de Allende to San Luis Potosí, due to administrative issues on the part of the owners. 

However, the team began to suffer economic problems that led to put at risk the future of the franchise. This event caused the players and coaching staff to manage the travel expenses on their own and to report the abandonment by the team executives. So it was thought to take the franchise to another location.

In February 2019 the team changed management, and was renamed as CF Real Potosino, however, the team kept the name FC Potosino in the Mexican Football Federation register, the team adopted gold and blue colors as part of the new identity and created soccer training schools to bring players to the team.. Also, it was announced that the franchise will try to change its name to San Luis C.F.

The new owners of the club tried to create a sports project in the city of Saltillo under the name Club Furia Saltillo, however, they withdrew the offer because there were no sports conditions in that city. Subsequently, the project managers announced that they would seek another location, with the FC Potosino team finally being chosen.

Since the arrival in San Luis Potosí, the team was relegated to a second plane due to the boom and subsequent promotion of Atlético San Luis, which caused a low number of fans for Real Potosino, finally, in July 2019, the board reached an agreement to relocate the team to Salamanca, Guanajuato and rename it as Salamanca F.C.,  however, the new team maintained FC Potosino as its official name, because the agreement was given after the presentation of the participating teams of the season. Finally, the new team was rejected by the league due to breach of infrastructure requirements, so the FC Potosino franchise was put on hiatus during the 2019–2020 season.

Players

Current squad

References

External links 
 FC Potosino  on Liga MX Website
 FC Potosino on Liga Premier Website.

Football clubs in San Luis Potosí
Segunda División de México
2018 establishments in Mexico